"The Day of Forever" is a 1966 science fiction short story by J. G. Ballard, which was published in the anthology of the same title.

Setting
The events of the story unfold on Earth at some undisclosed era in the future when the planet has ceased to rotate, hence the opening line, "At Columbine Sept Heures it was always dusk."

Cultural references
Grant Morrison has stated that the hero of this story was the major inspiration for the character of Gideon Stargrave.

References

Dystopian literature
Short stories by J. G. Ballard
1967 short stories